Tuxentius melaena, the black pie or dark pied Pierrot, is a butterfly of the family Lycaenidae. It is found in Africa.

The wingspan is 19–24 mm for males and 21–25 mm for females. Adults are on wing year-round, but are most common from October to March.

The larvae feed on Ziziphus mucronata and probably other Ziziphus species.

Subspecies
Tuxentius melaena melaena — South Africa (from Eastern Cape and KwaZulu-Natal coast, inland to Gauteng, Mpumalanga, Limpopo and North West) to Zimbabwe, Mozambique, Malawi, Zambia, Tanzania, Kenya, Ethiopia
Tuxentius melaena griqua (Trimen, 1887) — Northern Cape, South Africa

References

Butterflies described in 1887
Polyommatini
Butterflies of Africa
Taxa named by Roland Trimen